Ideals is an outdoor 1992 bronze sculpture by Muriel Castanis, located outside the Portland State Office Building in northeast Portland, Oregon.

Description and history

Ideals was commissioned in 1991 as part of the One Percent for Art in State Buildings Collection. It was completed by Castanis in February 1992 and installed at the northwest exterior corner of the Portland State Office Building (800 Northeast Oregon Street) in the Lloyd District. The bronze with green patina sculpture measures approximately  x  x . The Smithsonian Institution categorizes the work as abstract and allegorical ("hope") and describes it as a "standing female-like figure in the form of a hooded drapery garment with no visible figure inside". The Public Art Archives describes the sculpture as an "illusion of a human female form, defined by the draping and gathering of cloth rather than the positive space of the form herself". The figure is illuminated by four footlights in the base and its proper left arm is raised. The piece was surveyed and considered "well maintained" by Smithsonian's "Save Outdoor Sculpture!" program in 1993. Ideals is administered by the State of Oregon's Arts Commission.

See also

 1992 in art

References

External links

 Portland Cultural Tours: Public Art Waking Tour (pg. 2, PDF), Regional Arts & Culture Council

1992 establishments in Oregon
1992 sculptures
Abstract sculptures in Oregon
Allegorical sculptures in Oregon
Bronze sculptures in Oregon
Lloyd District, Portland, Oregon
Northeast Portland, Oregon
Outdoor sculptures in Portland, Oregon
Sculptures of women in Oregon
Statues in Portland, Oregon